MX-1 may refer to:

Vehicles 

 MX-1 (lunar lander), a lunar lander by Moon Express
 MX-1 Kalakian, a Philippine armored personnel carrier
 Quicksilver MX-1, an ultralight aircraft

Electronics 

 Pentax MX-1, a digital compact camera
 Picooz Extreme MX-1, a remote-controlled model helicopter
 Videonics MX-1, a video mixer
 DragonBall MX-1, codename MC9328MX1, later renamed to i.MX1, a CPU from Freescale (split-off from Motorola)

Other 

 A development project in Kwasa Damansara, Malaysia

 MX-1 world championship, a motocross world championship

See also 

 MX1, a human gene that encodes the mx1 protein
 mx1, a protein that in humans is encoded by the MX1 gene